Skinner Ridge is a ridge, 12 nautical miles (22 km) long, that descends southwestward from the western side of Eisenhower Range in Victoria Land. Mounts Fenton and Mackintosh are astride the northern part of this ridge. The feature was visited by the Southern Party of New Zealand Geological Survey Antarctic Expedition (NZGSAE) (1962–63), who named it for D.N.B. Skinner, geologist with the expedition.

Ridges of Victoria Land
Scott Coast